Barta may refer to:

Barta (surname)
Pen name of David Korner (1914–1976), Romanian and French communist militant, trade unionist, and journalist
Barta, Bangladesh, a village in Barisal District in the Barisal Division of southern-central Bangladesh
Barta'a, a town that straddles Israel and the West Bank
Bārta parish, an administrative unit of the Grobiņa municipality, Latvia
Bārta, river in Latvia and Lithuania
Barta River, river in Romania
Berks Area Regional Transportation Authority, a public transportation system which operates in Berks County, Pennsylvania
Berta language spoken by the Berta in Sudan and Ethiopia
Territory inhabited by the Bartians, an extinct Prussian tribe

See also
Bartas